Assunta Marchetti (15 August 1871 – 1 July 1948) was an Italian Roman Catholic professed religious and the co-founder of the Missionary Sisters of Saint Charles Borromeo Scalabrinians; she worked in Brazil from 1895 until her death. She has been beatified as a Blessed Mother. Her priest brother Giuseppe is titled as Venerable on the path to sainthood.

Her beatification was celebrated on 25 October 2014; Cardinal Angelo Amato presided over the beatification on the behalf of Pope Francis.

Life
Maria Assunta Caterina Marchetti was born on 15 August 1871 to Angelo Marchetti (1846-93) and Carola Ghilarducci as the third of eleven children; she received her baptism on 16 August. Her siblings were:
 Agostino
 Giuseppe (3 October 1869 - 14 December 1896): Scalabrinian priest later titled as Venerable in 2016.
 Angela
 Teresa
 Pio
 Vincenzo
 Elvira
 Filomena
 Maria Luisa
 Filomena
In 1880 all relocated to Mulino di Camaiore where her father commenced work as a miller. Marchetti received her Confirmation in 1883 and made her First Communion at the same time. Her aunt Caterina was an influence for her religious formation.

Marchetti led a pious life as a child but suffered hardships with a frail mother and the premature death of her father from pneumonia in 1893 and she had to help her mother and halt pursuing her dream to enter the Carmelites. The girl later met Giovanni Battista Scalabrini and made vows as a nun into his hands on 25 October 1895 in Piacenza with her widowed mother and two companions Angela Larini and Maria Francheschini. In 1895 her priest brother Giuseppe invited her to work with him abroad in Brazil to cater to the orphans of Italian immigrants. Marchetti accepted the invitation and travelled there alongside her mother and two companions (Larini and Francheschini) setting off from Genoa on 26 October 1895. Both she and her priest brother later co-founded the Missionaries of Saint Charles Borromeo - or the Scalabrinian Sisters - not long after their arrival. Her mother later left Brazil back for her homeland to tend to her children in 1897. In October 1897 she made her perpetual profession to Father Faustino Consoni. She collaborated with Scalabrini in 1904 when he visited Brazil for a month not long before the latter died.

Marchetti was hospitalized in 1947 and was treated for varicose veins and erysipelas. Marchetti's condition deteriorated over the next several months and she later died in 1948 at 3:15 with two priests and others present at her bedside.

Beatification
The beatification process started under Pope John Paul II on 24 January 1987 and as such she became titled as a Servant of God; Cardinal Paulo Evaristo Arns inaugurated the diocesan process in São Paulo on 12 June 1987 and later concluded it on 25 October 1991; the Congregation for the Causes of Saints validated this process on 17 December 1993 and received the Positio from the postulation in 2004. Theologians approved the cause's merits on 17 September 2010 as did the C.C.S. on 18 October 2011. The confirmation of her life of heroic virtue on 19 December 2011 allowed for Pope Benedict XVI to title her as Venerable.

The process for investigating a miracle took place in Porto Alegre from 7 April 1999 until 20 July 2000 prior to the C.C.S. validating this process on 16 November 2001. Medical experts approved this healing as a miracle on 9 February 2012 as did theologians on 14 February 2013 and the C.C.S. on 24 September 2013. Pope Francis approved this miracle on 9 October 2013 and the beatification date was confirmed on 17 December 2013.

Cardinal Angelo Amato presided over the beatification on the pope's behalf on 25 October 2014. The miracle was the permanent cure in 1994 of Heraclides Teixeira Filho of heart disease and other related ailments.

The current postulator for this cause is Sister Leocadia Mezzomo.

References

External links
 Hagiography Circle
 Saints SQPN

1871 births
1948 deaths
19th-century venerated Christians
19th-century Italian Roman Catholic religious sisters and nuns
20th-century venerated Christians
Beatifications by Pope Francis
Brazilian beatified people
Founders of Catholic religious communities
Italian beatified people
Italian emigrants to Brazil
Religious leaders from Lucca
Venerated Catholics by Pope Benedict XVI